Jean Paul de Gua de Malves (1713, Malves-en-Minervois (Aude) – June 2, 1785, Paris) was a French mathematician who published in 1740 a work on analytical geometry in which he applied it, without the aid of differential calculus, to find the tangents, asymptotes, and various singular points of an algebraic curve.

He further showed how singular points and isolated loops were affected by conical projection. He gave the proof of Descartes's rule of signs which is to be found in most modern works. It is not clear whether Descartes ever proved it strictly, and Newton seems to have regarded it as obvious.

De Gua de Malves was acquainted with many of the French philosophes during the last decades of the Ancien Régime. He was an early, short-lived, participant, then editor (later replaced by Diderot) of the project that ended up as the Encyclopédie. Condorcet claimed that it was in fact the de Gua who recruited Diderot to the project, though this claim has never been  verified. In either case, Jean-Paul and Jean le Rond d'Alembert, also thought to have been recruited by the de Gua, first show up on the December 1746 payroll of the publishers who were backing the Encyclopédie project. Diderot was added just weeks later and took over as editor on 16 October 1747. At the funeral of the "profound geometrician", as Diderot called him, the eulogy was given by Condorcet.

He was elected a Fellow of the Royal Society in 1743.

See also 
 De Gua's theorem

References

Bibliography 
Arthur M. Wilson: Diderot. Oxford University Press, New York, 1972, pp. 79–81.
Nicolas de Condorcet, « Éloge de M. l’abbé de Gua », Œuvres de Condorcet, Firmin Didot frères, 1847-1849, Paris, p. 241-58. (online copy)
Rene Taton: Gua De Malves, Jean Paul De. Complete Dictionary of Scientific Biography, 2008.

1713 births
1785 deaths
People from Carcassonne
English–French translators
18th-century French mathematicians
Members of the French Academy of Sciences
Contributors to the Encyclopédie (1751–1772)
Fellows of the Royal Society
French geometers
18th-century French translators